Jan Kuf (born 11 May 1991) is a Czech athlete who competes in the modern pentathlon. His biggest success so far came in 2016, when he became the European champion in individual race and mixed relay (with Natalie Dianová). He owns gold medal from 2015 World Modern Pentathlon Championships in Berlin in mixed relay as well.

References

External links

1991 births
Living people
Czech male modern pentathletes
Olympic modern pentathletes of the Czech Republic
Modern pentathletes at the 2016 Summer Olympics
World Modern Pentathlon Championships medalists
Sportspeople from Prague
Modern pentathletes at the 2020 Summer Olympics